USS Percy Drayton was a sloop captured by the Union Navy during the American Civil War.  She served the Union Navy’s struggle against the Confederate States of America as a ship’s tender, supporting the Union ships on blockade duty with provisions, ammunition, water, and other needs.

Service history 

Assigned to the South Atlantic Blockading Squadron she performed tender duties at North Edisto, South Carolina, until May 1865. Shifted then to Port Royal, South Carolina, she was sold for $370, 2 September 1865, to George Crane.

See also 

Blockade runners of the American Civil War
Blockade mail of the Confederacy

References 

Ships of the Union Navy
Sloops of the United States Navy
Tenders of the United States Navy
American Civil War auxiliary ships of the United States